Daniel I may refer to:

 Daniel I of Armenia (ruled 347)
 Archbishop Danilo I of the Serbian Orthodox Church (ruled 1271–1272)
 Daniel of Moscow (1261–1303)
 Daniel I of Kongo (ruled 1674–78)
 Metropolitan Danilo I Petrović-Njegoš (1670–1735)
 Danilo I, Prince of Montenegro (1826–1860)
 Danilo, Crown Prince of Montenegro (1871–1939)
 Patriarch Daniel of Romania (b. 1951)